Dazhou railway station is a railway station in Tongchuan District, Dazhou, Sichuan, China. It is an intermediate stop on the Xiangyang–Chongqing railway and the terminus of the Dazhou–Chengdu railway and Dazhou–Wanzhou railway.

References 

Railway stations in Sichuan